Lala may refer to:

Geography 
 Lala language (disambiguation)

Places
 Lala (Naples Metro), an underground metro station in Naples, Italy
 Lala, Assam, a town in Assam, India
 Lala, Ilam, a village in Ilam Province, Iran
 Lala, Lanao del Norte, a municipality in the Philippines
 Lala, Mazandaran, a village in Mazandaran Province, Iran
 Lala, Pakistan, a village in Punjab Province
 Lala River (disambiguation)
 Lala, Lebanon, village in the  Beqaa Governorate, Lebanon

People 
 Lala (given name)
 Lala (nickname)
 Lala (surname)
 Lala (title) a Turkish title meaning tutor
 Lala Kara Mustafa Pasha (c. 1500-1580), Ottoman general and Grand Vizier
 Lala Shahin Pasha (1330-after 1388), Ottoman governor

Fictional characters
 Lala, the title character of Fancy Lala, a 1998 anime series
 Lala Hagoromo, a character of Japanese anime Star Twinkle Precure
 Lala Satalin Deviluke, the main female character in To Love-Ru
 Lala or Lara Doucette, the main female character on the video podcast Tiki Bar TV

Brands and enterprises
 Lala (website), a former online music store, originally a web-based CD trading community
 Grupo Lala, a Mexican dairy company
 LaLa, a Japanese manga magazine
 LALA FC, a football club from Ciudad Guayana, Venezuela

Entertainment
 "Lala" song by The Obsessives
 "Lala (Unlocked)", a 2021 song by Alicia Keys

Other uses
 Hurricane Lala, in the 1984 Pacific hurricane season
 Lala (Chinese slang), a Chinese slang term for lesbian (non-derogatory)

See also
 La La (disambiguation)